Campbelltown is an unincorporated community in Patoka Township, Pike County, in the U.S. state of Indiana.

History
The community's name honors Samuel Campbell, a pioneer merchant.

Geography

References

Unincorporated communities in Pike County, Indiana
Unincorporated communities in Indiana